Strigatella litterata is a species of sea snail, a marine gastropod mollusk in the family Mitridae, the miters or miter snails.

Description
The shell size varies between 11 mm and 35 mm

Distribution
This species occurs in the Red Sea and in the Indian Ocean along the Mascarene Basin, Mauritius, Mozambique and Transkei (RSA); in the Western Pacific Ocean along Australia, Papua New Guinea, Okinawa, the Philippines and Indonesia.

References

 Taylor, J.D. (1971). Intertidal Zonation at Aldabra Atoll. Phil. Trns. Roy. Soc. Lond. B. 260, 173–213
 Cernohorsky W. O. (1976). The Mitrinae of the World. Indo-Pacific Mollusca 3(17) page(s): 482
 Drivas, J. & M. Jay (1988). Coquillages de La Réunion et de l'île Maurice Branch, G.M. et al. (2002). Two Oceans. 5th impression. David Philip, Cate Town & Johannesburg
 Poppe G.T. & Tagaro S.P. (2008). Mitridae. Pp. 330-417, in: G.T. Poppe (ed.), Philippine marine mollusks, volume 2. Hackenheim: ConchBooks. 848 pp.

External links
 Lamarck (J.B.M.de). (1811). Suite de la détermination des espèces de Mollusques testacés. Mitre (Mitra.). Annales du Muséum National d'Histoire Naturelle. 17: 195-222.
 Reeve, L. A. (1844-1845). Monograph of the genus Mitra. In: Conchologia Iconica, or, illustrations of the shells of molluscous animals, vol. 2, pl. 1-39 and unpaginated text. L. Reeve & Co., London.
 Lesson R. P. (1842). Mollusques recueillis dans la Mer du Sud. Genre Mitra et Pleurotoma. Revue Zoologique par la Société Cuvierienne. 5: 141-144
 Küster, H. C. (1838-1841). Die Familie der Walzenschnecken. (Volutacea, Menke.) Systematisches Conchylien-Cabinet von Martini und Chemnitz, ed.2, 5(2): vii-x, pp. 1-234, pls A, B, 1-49, 17a-e. Published in parts
 Fedosov A., Puillandre N., Herrmann M., Kantor Yu., Oliverio M., Dgebuadze P., Modica M.V. & Bouchet P. (2018). The collapse of Mitra: molecular systematics and morphology of the Mitridae (Gastropoda: Neogastropoda). Zoological Journal of the Linnean Society. 183(2): 253-337

Mitridae
Gastropods described in 1811